Allobates wayuu is a species of frog in the family Aromobatidae. It is endemic to the Serranía de Macuira in La Guajira Department, Colombia, and is only known from its type locality in the Macuira National Natural Park.

Etymology
The specific name wayuu refers to Wayuu people, an ethnic group from the extreme north of Colombia.

Description
Males measure  and females  in snout–vent length. The snout is nearly ovoid in dorsal view and anteriorly inclined in lateral view. The tympanum is partly concealed. The canthus rostralis is acute but not prominent. The fingers and toes bear expanded discs; fingers are unwebbed whereas toes have some webbing. Skin is smooth. The body is brown while the limbs are creme; the hind limbs have brown bars. The sides are dark brown and have dorsolateral bands. The lips are cream. The belly is creamy with some brownish-gray spots.

Habitat and conservation
The eggs are deposited on the forest floor. The male carries the hatched tadpoles to streams and ponds where they complete their development. The known population is within the Parque Nacional Natural Macuira.

References

wayuu
Amphibians of Colombia
Endemic fauna of Colombia
Amphibians described in 1999
Taxonomy articles created by Polbot
Taxa named by Luis Aurelio Coloma